West London Sharks RLFC was a rugby league team based in Chiswick, London. West London Sharks are now playing at Chiswick RFU, Dukes Meadow, in Chiswick under the name of South West London Chargers. They compete in the South Premier Division of the Rugby League Conference. The club runs an additional social side in the London League competition and a women's team playing in the Women's South competition.

West London Sharks merged with South London Storm to form South West London Chargers in 2013.

History
West London was one of the founding ten teams of the pilot Southern Conference League in 1997 competing in the Eastern Division. The team was based on the old London ARL clubs, Brent-Ealing. Ealing were formed in 1967 and were based at six grounds in the first 21 years. Another club London Colonials lasted another four years in the London League before merging into West London at the start of the Southern Conference, they 
   
The club became West London Sharks for the renamed Rugby League Conference in 1998 and the London Broncos briefly ran the club as their 'alliance' team. This time they played in the Southern Division. West London entered a second string in the London League in 2000.

In 2001-3, the Division was renamed London & South Division but was the South Division for 2004 when West London Sharks won it. Rugby union international Trevor Leota starred for West London that season.

In 2005, West London stepped up to the South Premier Division.

West London won the South Premier in 2008 and the 'A' team won the London League. The first team made it to the Harry Jepson grand final but lost to Nottingham Outlaws 8 - 28.

West London Sharks merged with South London Storm to form South West London Chargers in 2013.

Juniors
West London Sharks Youth ran sides at under-13, under-14 and under-16 in the London Junior League. Boys under the age of 12 can play for cluster clubs Feltham Falcons or Whitton Warriors.

Club honours
 RLC South Division: 2004
 RLC South Premier: 2008, 2009
 London League: 2003, 2008
 Harry Jepson Trophy: 2009
 Women's Rugby League Conference: 2008

Club Officials
 Club Chairman: Mike Byrnes
 Club Secretary: Donny Lam
 Director of Rugby: Mark Barnes
 Women's Team Manager: Christina Ovenden

External links
Official Website
 New Website

Rugby League Conference teams
Rugby league teams in London
Rugby clubs established in 1997
Defunct rugby league teams in England
1997 establishments in England
2013 disestablishments in England
Sports clubs disestablished in 2013